This is a list of 119 species in Trichocera, a genus of winter crane flies in the family Trichoceridae.

Trichocera species

 Trichocera abieticola Alexander, 1935 c g
 Trichocera alpina Stary, 2000 c g
 Trichocera alticola Alexander, 1935 c g
 Trichocera altipons Starý, 1998 c g
 Trichocera andorrensis Krzeminska, 2000 c g
 Trichocera annulata Meigen, 1818 i c g b
 Trichocera antennata Stary, 1999 c g
 Trichocera arctica Lundstrom, 1915 i c g
 Trichocera arisanensis Alexander, 1935 c g
 Trichocera arnaudi Pratt, 2003 c g
 Trichocera auripennis Alexander, 1960 c g
 Trichocera banffi Pratt, 2003 c g
 Trichocera barraudi Krzeminska, 2002 c g
 Trichocera basidens Starý, 1998 c g
 Trichocera bellula Alexander, 1961 c g
 Trichocera bifurcata Nakamura & Saigusa, 1997 c g
 Trichocera bilobata Stary, 1999 c g
 Trichocera bimacula Walker, 1848 i c g b
 Trichocera bisignata Alexander, 1959 c g
 Trichocera bituberculata Alexander, 1924 i c g
 Trichocera borealis Lackschewitz, 1934 i c g
 Trichocera brevicornis Alexander, 1952 i c g
 Trichocera brumalis Fitch, 1847 i c g
 Trichocera calva Stary, 1999 c g
 Trichocera candida Dahl, 1976 c g
 Trichocera carpathica Stary & Martinovsky, 1996 c g
 Trichocera chaetopyga Nakamura & Saigusa, 1996 c g
 Trichocera colei Alexander, 1919 i c g
 Trichocera columbiana Alexander, 1927 i c g
 Trichocera corallifera Nakamura & Saigusa, 1997 c g
 Trichocera cordata Nakamura & Saigusa, 1997 c g
 Trichocera crassicauda Nakamura & Saigusa, 1996 c g
 Trichocera dahlae Mendl, 1971 g
 Trichocera excilis Dahl, 1967 i c g
 Trichocera fattigiana Alexander, 1952 i c g
 Trichocera fernaldi Alexander, 1927 i
 Trichocera forcipula Nielsen, 1920 c g
 Trichocera garretti Alexander, 1927 i c g b
 Trichocera geigeri Stary & Krzeminska, 2000 c g
 Trichocera gigantea (Dahl, 1967) c g
 Trichocera glacialis Alexander, 1936 c g
 Trichocera hiemalis (De Geer, 1776) i c g
 Trichocera hirta Stary & Martinovsky, 1996 c g
 Trichocera hyaloptera Alexander, 1949 i
 Trichocera hypandrialis Nakamura & Saigusa, 1997 c g
 Trichocera idahoensis Pratt, 2003 c g
 Trichocera imanishii (Tokunaga, 1935) c
 Trichocera implicata Dahl, 1976 c g
 Trichocera inexplorata (Dahl, 1967) c g
 Trichocera irina Krzeminska, 1996 c g
 Trichocera japonica Matsumura, 1915 c g
 Trichocera kotejai Krzeminska, 1992 c g
 Trichocera lackschewitzi Lantsov, 1987 c g
 Trichocera lantsovi Krzeminska, 1996 c g
 Trichocera latilobata Alexander, 1938 c g
 Trichocera latipons Podenas, 2017 g
 Trichocera limpidipennis Loew, 1873 c g
 Trichocera longisetosa Alexander, 1927 i
 Trichocera lutea Becher, 1886 i c g
 Trichocera mackenziei (Dahl, 1967) c g
 Trichocera maculipennis Meigen, 1818 i c g
 Trichocera major Edwards, 1921 c g
 Trichocera marocana  g
 Trichocera mendli Dahl, 1976 c g
 Trichocera mexicana Alexander, 1946 c g
 Trichocera michali Krzeminska, 1999 c g
 Trichocera minuta Tokunaga, 1938 c g
 Trichocera mirabilis Alexander, 1934 c g
 Trichocera mishmi Krzeminska, 2002 c g
 Trichocera monochroma (Harris, 1835) i
 Trichocera monstrosa Nakamura & Saigusa, 1997 c g
 Trichocera montium Stary, 2002 c g
 Trichocera mutica Dahl, 1966 c g
 Trichocera nipponensis Tokunaga, 1938 c g
 Trichocera obtusa Stary & Martinovsky, 1996 c g
 Trichocera ocellata Walker, 1856 c g
 Trichocera oregelationis (Linnaeus, 1758) i g
 Trichocera pallens Alexander, 1954 i c g
 Trichocera pappi Krzeminska, 2003 c g
 Trichocera parva Meigen, 1804 c g
 Trichocera percincta Alexander, 1961 c g
 Trichocera pictipennis Alexander, 1930 c g
 Trichocera polanensis Stary, 2002 c g
 Trichocera pubescens Stary & Martinovsky, 1996 c g
 Trichocera recondita Stary, 2000 c g
 Trichocera rectistylus Starý, 1998 c g
 Trichocera regelationis (Linnaeus, 1758) c g
 Trichocera reticulata Alexander, 1933 c g
 Trichocera rufescens Edwards, 1921 c g
 Trichocera rufulenta Edwards, 1938 g
 Trichocera salmani Alexander, 1927 i c g
 Trichocera saltator (Harris, 1776) c g
 Trichocera sapporensis Alexander, 1935 c g
 Trichocera sardiniensis Petrasiunas, 2009 c g
 Trichocera schmidi Alexander, 1959 c g
 Trichocera scutellata Say, 1824 i c g
 Trichocera setosivena Alexander, 1927 i c g
 Trichocera sibirica Edwards, 1920 c g
 Trichocera simonyi Mik, 1886 c g
 Trichocera skrobli Podenas, 1991 c g
 Trichocera sparsa Stary & Martinovsky, 1996 c g
 Trichocera superna Alexander, 1961 c g
 Trichocera szechwanensis Alexander, 1935 c g
 Trichocera tenuicercus Alexander, 1959 c g
 Trichocera tenuistylus Stary & Geiger, 1995 c g
 Trichocera tetonensis Alexander, 1945 i c g
 Trichocera thaleri Stary, 2000 c g
 Trichocera thaumastopyga Alexander, 1960 c g
 Trichocera ticina Stary & Podenas, 1995 c g
 Trichocera transversa Starý, 1998 c g
 Trichocera triangularis Alexander, 1968 c g
 Trichocera truncata Nakamura & Saigusa, 1997 c g
 Trichocera tsutsui Tokunaga, 1938 c g
 Trichocera tuberculifera Alexander, 1938 c g
 Trichocera unimaculata Yang & Yang, 1995 c g
 Trichocera ursamajor Alexander, 1959 i c g
 Trichocera variata Alexander, 1961 c g
 Trichocera venosa Dietz, 1921 i
 Trichocera villosa Stary, 2009 c g

Data sources: i = ITIS, c = Catalogue of Life, g = GBIF, b = Bugguide.net

References

Trichocera
Articles created by Qbugbot